Ha Jae-sook (born January 7, 1979) is a South Korean actress. She dropped out of Hankuk University of Foreign Studies to pursue an acting career, and made her theater debut in 2000. After several years on stage, she first appeared onscreen in 2006 as a pro-wrestler in Alone in Love. Ha has continued to play supporting roles in television dramas, notably as the heroine's best friend in Protect the Boss (2011), and an overweight wife who undergoes extensive plastic surgery in Birth of a Beauty (2014).

She married Lee Jun-haeng, a former Special Forces officer, in 2016. The couple have a scuba diving shop in Gangwon-do.

Filmography

Television series

Film

Variety Shows

Theater

References

External links
 Ha Jae-sook at Family Actors Entertainment 
 
 
 

1979 births
Living people
Mystic Entertainment artists
South Korean stage actresses
South Korean musical theatre actresses
South Korean television actresses
South Korean film actresses
People from Daegu